Tyrone Clarence "Ty" Fahner (born November 18, 1942) is an American lawyer and a former Illinois Attorney General.

Early life and education
Tyrone Clarence Fahner was born on November 18, 1942, in Detroit, Michigan, to Warren Fahner, a Chrysler employee, and Alma (Newman) Fahner, who worked at Michigan Bell as a telephone operator.

Fahner graduating from Denby High School in 1961 and became a student at the University of Michigan at Ann Arbor, where he was a member of the Delta Tau Delta fraternity. He received his B.A. from the University of Michigan in 1965, his J.D. from the Wayne State University Law School in 1968, and his LL.M. from the Northwestern University School of Law in 1971.

Career
In the early 1970s, after a short period in private practice, Fahner became an Assistant U.S. Attorney in the U.S. Attorney's Office for the Northern District of Illinois, serving under then-U.S. Attorney James R. (Jim) Thompson.  Fahner was a lawyer with the law firm of Freeman, Rothe, Freeman & Salzman in Chicago from 1975 to 1977.

Thompson was subsequently elected governor of Illinois and in 1977 selected Fahner to serve as his director of the Illinois Department of Law Enforcement, a post which Thompson retained until 1979.

In 1980, Thompson appointed Fahner to serve as Illinois Attorney General, filling the vacancy created after Attorney General William J. Scott was convicted of tax evasion. Fahner ran for a full term as attorney general, but was defeated by Democratic candidate Neil F. Hartigan in the 1982 election.

After leaving office in 1983, Fahner returned to private practice, joining the law firm Mayer Brown LLP as a partner. Fahner served on the firm's management committee from 1985 to 2007, and was its co-chairman from 1998 to 2001 and its chairman from 2001 to 2007.

In 2015, Fahner wrote a letter to U.S. District Judge Thomas M. Durkin urging a lenient sentence for former House Speaker Dennis Hastert, who had pleaded guilty to unlawfully structuring bank withdrawals to avoid reporting requirements. (Hastert had made secret payments to a man whom he had sexually abused decades earlier, when Hastert was a high school teacher and coach). Fahner referred to Hastert as "a kind, strong, principled, and unselfish man" and wrote: "I urge the court to permit him to live the rest of his life in freedom with his family and friends, and all those who love and admire him." Fahner subsequently said that it was a mistake for him to use Mayer Brown firm letterhead for the letter.

In the 2016 Republican Party presidential primaries, Fahner was a delegate pledged to the presidential campaign of Jeb Bush.

Memberships and board service
In 1988, Ronald Reagan appointed Fahner to the Board of Foreign Scholarships, for a term ending in 1991.

Fahner joined the board of trustees of the Shedd Aquarium in 2004, and became the chairman of the board in 2012.

Fahner is president of the civic committee of the Commercial Club of Chicago.

Personal life
Fahner is married to Anne Fahner. The family lived in Evanston for many years until moving to Northfield in 2014.

Notes

1942 births
Living people
People from Evanston, Illinois
People from Northfield, Illinois
Politicians from Detroit
University of Michigan alumni
Wayne State University Law School alumni
Wayne State University faculty
Northwestern University Pritzker School of Law alumni
Illinois lawyers
Illinois Attorneys General
Illinois Republicans
People associated with Mayer Brown